The Wiedenbeck-Dobelin Warehouse is located in Madison, Wisconsin.

History
The warehouse was built for a company that produced hardware for blacksmithing and wagon-building companies. In 1987, it was converted into an apartment building. During the 1990s, the Kohl Center was constructed next to it.

The building was listed on the National Register of Historic Places in 1986 and on the State Register of Historic Places in 1989.

References

Warehouses on the National Register of Historic Places
Industrial buildings and structures on the National Register of Historic Places in Wisconsin
Residential buildings on the National Register of Historic Places in Wisconsin
National Register of Historic Places in Madison, Wisconsin
Buildings and structures in Madison, Wisconsin
Brick buildings and structures
Industrial buildings completed in 1907
Industrial tool manufacturers